Miss Ellie (c. 1993 – June 1, 2010), a blind American  Chinese Crested hairless dog, was the 2009 winner in the pedigree section of the World's Ugliest Dog Contest. She appeared in shows at the Comedy Barn in Pigeon Forge, Tennessee, and was featured on the Animal Planet cable show Dogs 101. Dawn Goehring rescued Miss Ellie at seven years old. Miss Ellie died on June 1, 2010, at age 17.

See also
 Sam (ugly dog)

References

Individual dogs in the United States
1993 animal births
2010 animal deaths